Charles Drueding (July 19, 1913 – January 6, 1970) was an American rower. He competed in the men's coxed four event at the 1932 Summer Olympics.

References

External links
 

1913 births
1970 deaths
American male rowers
Olympic rowers of the United States
Rowers at the 1932 Summer Olympics
Rowers from Philadelphia